The women's balance beam competition at the 2012 Summer Olympics in London was held at the North Greenwich Arena on 7 August. Deng Linlin of China took gold, Sui Lu of China took silver, and Aly Raisman of the United States took the bronze via a tie-breaker.

Format of competition

The top eight competitors in the qualification phase (with a limit of two per country) advanced to the final. Qualification scores were then ignored, with only final-round scores counting.

Final results
Oldest and youngest competitors

Qualification results

* Kyla Ross (USA), ranked 6th, and Anastasia Grishina (RUS), ranked 9th, did not advance to the final because of the two-per-country rule.

* Larisa Iordache (ROU), Aliya Mustafina (RUS), Jordyn Wieber (USA), and Sandra Izbașa (ROU) ranked 11th, 12th, 12th, and 14th, respectively, but did not qualify as reserves because of the two-per-country rule. On 6 August, Diana Bulimar gave up her spot to Iordache, whom Bulimar believed had a better chance of medaling.

 Raisman was initially given a D score of 6.200 for a total score of 14.966. However, on appeal, her D score was raised to 6.300 for a total score of 15.066 and a third-place tie with Ponor. The tie was broken based on Raisman's higher E score.

References

Gymnastics at the 2012 Summer Olympics
2012
2012 in women's gymnastics
Women's events at the 2012 Summer Olympics